Workforce modeling is the process by which the need for skilled workers at a particular point in time (demand) is matched directly with the availability and preference of skilled workers (supply). The resulting mathematical models may be used to perform sensitivity analysis and generate data output in the form of reports and schedules.

Due to the complexity level of building a workforce model, adoption of a workforce model is usually found in industries that have complex work rules, skilled or certified workers, medium to large teams of workers and fluctuating demand. Some examples include healthcare, public safety, and retail.

A workforce modeling solution can also refer to software that effectively captures all the complexity of process from start to finish and delivers complete and correct results. Components include:
Demand management – tracking the demand for skilled workers by small units of time (generally 15 or 30 minutes)
Employee availability – tracking of contractual work hour obligations and limits on an individual basis for each employee
Employee preference – tracking of preferred times and dates that employees wish to work (used to help increase job satisfaction)
Workflow management – ability for the solution to automate normally manual processes such as requesting and approving time off, requesting shift swaps, and generating and posting schedules
Optimization Engine – uses the mathematical model to create numerous schedules that are complete and correct and can be optimized on many dimensions simultaneously. The most important are cost, overtime and employee satisfaction.

Definition
For a more detailed definition, the term must be differentiated from traditional staff scheduling. Staff scheduling is rooted in time management and encompasses the mere administration of past and future working times. However, during the last ten to fifteen years, this traditional approach has evolved towards a demand-oriented solution which, under economic aspects, also includes changes in personnel requirements and objectives when optimizing the scheduling of staff. Besides the two core aspects of demand-orientation and optimization, workforce modeling also incorporates the forecast of the workload and the required staff, the integration of employees into the scheduling process through interactivity, the management of working times and accounts as well as analyzing and monitoring the entire process.

Workforce modeling solutions can, and should, be deployed enterprise-wide wherever complex scheduling needs or legal staffing ratios must be met. Due to the complex nature of a workforce model, creating one by hand is nearly impossible. By using a software solution for demand-oriented workforce management, planners can optimize staffing by creating schedules that at all times conform as closely as possible to the actual requirement. At the same time, a workforce modeling solution helps users to observe all relevant legislation, local agreements and the contracts with individual employees – including work-life balance guidelines.

Complexity of model
Many workforce modeling solution applications use the more common linear programming approach to create the Workforce Model. Linear methods of achieving a schedule are generally based on assumptions that demand is based on a series of independent events, all of which have a consistent, predictable outcome. Although this method is very common, the results are in most cases not as complete or efficient. In general, they produce a resulting schedule that is up to 75% complete and leaves the scheduler to complete the remaining shift assignments.

Heuristics have been applied to the problem and metaheuristics has been identified as the best method for generating complex scheduling solutions. Using this technique, many more solutions are available to the modeling process resulting in schedules that are not only closer to 100% complete, but are also optimized to many different criteria at the same time.

Notes

Further reading
Sterman JD. Business Dynamics: Systems Thinking and Modeling For a Complex World. Boston, MA: McGraw-Hill Publishers; 2000.
Taleb NN. The Black Swan. New York, NY: Random House; 2007.
West B, Griffin L. Biodynamics: Why the Wirewalker Doesn't Fall. Hoboken, NJ: John Wiley & Sons Inc; 2004.

Management systems
Human resource management